A Special Providence is a novel by American writer Richard Yates. First published in 1969, Yates' third book concerns the dual exploits of an awkward infantry soldier in World War II and his mother, a deluded sculptor living in New York City.

Plot summary
Robert Prentice is drafted after graduating high school and enters World War II during its final days. His hopes of glory are dashed by the fact that the fighting is almost all over. He proves to be an incompetent soldier and soon spends time in an infirmary with pneumonia. When he returns to his unit he continues to struggle but finally achieves a kind of acceptance.

This narrative is interspersed with scenes from his childhood viewed from the perspective of his mother, Alice Prentice. She spends Robert's childhood moving from place to place mainly within New York accruing increasingly larger debts as her sculpting earns less and less money. She increasingly slips into despair as the novel ends and Robert decides not to return home.

Reception
Zadie Smith described the novel as being "like Breakfast At Tiffany's spliced with All Quiet On The Western Front. Impossible to paraphrase, wonderful to read."

References

1969 American novels
Novels by Richard Yates
Alfred A. Knopf books
Novels set during World War II
Novels set in New York City